The Upper Silesian Ethnographic Park is an open-air museum in Chorzów, Poland. The area of the park is 25 hectare.

The museum presents a range of agricultural buildings from all over Silesia. Amongst those are cottages from the Beskids, farmsteads from the Pszczyna region, a wooden church from Nieboczowy dating from the 18th century, and a large number of buildings and artifacts from Istebna in Cieszyn Silesia.

External links 
 Homepage of the park 

Open-air museums in Poland
Buildings and structures in Chorzów
Museums in Silesian Voivodeship